Anping Town is an urban town and subdivision of Lianyuan, Hunan Province, People's Republic of China.

Administrative division
The town is divided into 53 villages and 1 community, the following areas: 
 
 Xiangzhong Community
 Hengyan Village
 Daqiu Village
 Tangwanli Village
 Tongshu Village
 Datangbian Village
 Yanxi Village
 Guichang Village
 Yuanxin Village
 Tianxin Village
 Jingkeng Village
 Liushi Village
 Jiangjiang Village
 Shuanglong Village
 Liangshui Village
 Daoshi Village
 Yankeng Village
 Dashiling Village
 Tongjia Village
 Changxi Village
 Hengtang Village
 Zhanglong Village
 Meijia Village
 Shuiping Village
 Shuangtang Village
 Shideng Village
 Shiniu Village
 Xinhe Village
 Guanyin Village
 Tongmiao Village
 Qingshan Village
 Baimao Village
 Tangjia Village
 Xinwan Village
 Mafangkou Village
 Jimu Village
 Meitang Village
 Yanxia Village
 Wanfang Village
 Luoke Village
 Luguan Village
 Qiangyuan Village
 Jiangxia Village
 Zhangshuping Village
 Sigu Village
 Liujia Village
 Tianchong Village
 Changxiao Village
 Chenfu Village
 Niulang Village
 Yangliutian Village
 Dacha Village
 Fengshan Village
 Fengjiashan Village

External links

Divisions of Lianyuan